Nemanja Kojić (Serbian Cyrillic: Немања Којић; born 3 February 1990) is a Serbian professional footballer who plays as a striker for First League of the Republika Srpska club Zvijezda 09.

Career

Club

Rad
Born in Loznica, Kojić joined Rad as a trainee in 2003. He made his senior debuts in the 2006–07 season, recording three appearances in the process. In May 2008, Kojić broke his leg in a match against Sevojno, causing him to miss the entire 2008–09 season. On 2 May 2010, he scored his first senior career goal, finding the back of the net in a 1–0 home win over Jagodina. On 30 June 2011, he scored a goal and provided three assists in a 6–0 home win over Tre Penne in the first leg of Europa League first qualifying round. One week later, he scored twice in the return leg against Tre Penne in a 1–3 away win. On 19 August 2012, Kojić scored twice in a 2–2 away draw against Red Star Belgrade. He scored another brace on 1 September 2012 in a 2–3 away league win over Spartak Subotica.

Partizan
On 3 February 2013, on his 23rd birthday, Kojić was transferred to Partizan, together with Predrag Luka. Both players signed a three-and-a-half-year contract. Kojić made his debut for Partizan against Donji Srem on 2 March 2013. Four days later, Kojić scored his first two goals for Partizan in a 0–4 away league win over BSK Borča.

On 26 April 2014, Kojić scored the winning goal in the 90th minute of the Belgrade derby in a 2–1 home win over Red Star Belgrade. On 3 May 2014, Kojić scored a hat-trick in a 0–5 away win over Donji Srem. He finished the season as the club's top scorer with eight goals.

Gaziantep BB
In August 2016, Kojić joined Turkish second tier side Gaziantep BB, signing a three-year contract and was given the number 36 shirt.

Radnički Niš
On 15 February 2017, Kojić returned to his homeland and signed with Radnički Niš until the end of the 2016–17 season.

Tokyo Verdy
On 16 January 2019, Tokyo Verdy announced the signing of Kojić.

International
Kojić was a regular member of the Serbia national under-21 team during the qualifications for the 2013 UEFA European Championship.

Career statistics

Club

Honours
Partizan
 Serbian SuperLiga: 2012–13, 2014–15

Notes

References

External links
 
 
 

Serbian footballers
Association football forwards
FK Rad players
FK Partizan players
Gaziantep F.K. footballers
FK Radnički Niš players
İstanbulspor footballers
FC Ordabasy players
Tokyo Verdy players
FK Napredak Kruševac players
KF Bylis Ballsh players
FK Dečić players
PSS Sleman players
Serbian First League players
Serbian SuperLiga players
TFF First League players
Kazakhstan Premier League players
J2 League players
Kategoria e Parë players
Montenegrin First League players
Liga 1 (Indonesia) players
Sportspeople from Loznica
Serbia under-21 international footballers
Serbia youth international footballers
Serbian expatriate footballers
Expatriate footballers in Turkey
Serbian expatriate sportspeople in Turkey
Expatriate footballers in Kazakhstan
Serbian expatriate sportspeople in Kazakhstan
Expatriate footballers in Japan
Serbian expatriate sportspeople in Japan
Expatriate footballers in Albania
Serbian expatriate sportspeople in Albania
Expatriate footballers in Montenegro
Serbian expatriate sportspeople in Montenegro
Expatriate footballers in Indonesia
Serbian expatriate sportspeople in Indonesia
1990 births
Living people